Henry Walcott Farnam (November 6, 1853 – September 5, 1933) was an American economist.

Background
The son of railroad executive Henry Farnam, he attended Yale University graduating with a bachelor's degree in 1874, and then studied towards a M.A. in Roman law and economics in 1876. Like many American economists of the late 19th century, Farnam then went to Germany to study under the leading figures of the German historical school. Farnam earned a PhD from the University of Strasbourg in 1878.

Career

Farnam was professor of political economy at Yale University from 1880 to 1918. In 1911, he served as president of the American Economic Association.

The gift was the largest of its kind on record and would allow the settlement work to be conducted on a broader and more effective basis. Farnam was one of five Yale professors who, together with several women of New Haven, Connecticut composed the Council of the organization.  

That same year, Farnam co-founded the American Association for Labor Legislation (AALL) with other economists.

References

External links 

 

1853 births
1933 deaths
American economists
Yale University alumni
University of Strasbourg alumni
Yale University faculty
Fellows of the American Statistical Association
Presidents of the American Economic Association